Rahul Singh may refer to:

Rahul Singh (actor) (born 1966), Indian film actor
Rahul Singh (comic book character), a character in the Shekhar Kapur's comic Devi
Rahul Singh (cricketer, born 1992), Indian cricketer
Rahul Singh (cricketer, born 1995), Indian cricketer
Rahul Singh (cricketer, born 1997), Indian cricketer
Rahul Singh (field hockey) (born 1975), Indian Olympic hockey player
Rahul Singh (paramedic) (born 1970), Canadian paramedic and humanitarian

See also 
 Rahul (disambiguation)
 List of people with surname Singh